Wesley Zonneveld (born 17 June 1992) is a Dutch footballer who plays as a goalkeeper for Rijnsburgse Boys in the Tweede Divisie.

Career
Zonneveld played in the youth department of FC Lisse. As a seven-year-old, he was initially positioned as a goalkeeper, but later continued as a outfield player. At age 13, he returned to the goalkeeping position. Zonneveld played for Lisse for a few more years, moved to the AZ youth academy 2009. He was active in Alkmaar for two years. After his contract expired, he signed for SC Telstar, where he made his professional debut on 30 September 2011 in a match against PEC Zwolle. In this match, goalkeeper Stephan Veenboer was sent-off in the 86th minute with the score being 6–3 in favour of Zwolle. Head coach Jan Poortvliet then chose to remove striker Johan Plat from the lineup and instead let Zonneveld play as goalkeeper as a replacement for Veenboer. Due to a scored penalty shot by Joey van den Berg, PEC eventually won 7–3. In the 2015–16 season, he became the starting goalkeeper under head coach Michel Vonk, after an injury for regular starter Cor Varkevisser. That season, he was named "Goalkeeper Talent of the Year" of the second-tier Eerste Divisie.

In June 2019, Zonneveld moved to SVV Scheveningen from the Tweede Divisie after returning from a serious knee injury which he suffered in 2016. Halfway through the season, he signed with Rijnsburgse Boys whom he would join the from the start of the 2020–21 season.

References

External links
 Voetbal International profile 

1992 births
Living people
Dutch footballers
SC Telstar players
Eerste Divisie players
Footballers from Haarlem
AZ Alkmaar players
FC Lisse players
Association football goalkeepers
Tweede Divisie players
SVV Scheveningen players
Rijnsburgse Boys players